The Atob is a river of  northern Papua New Guinea, flowing to the west of Wewak. The river has been affected by mining in the region with alluvial deposits.

References

Rivers of Papua New Guinea
Sandaun Province